Lavoslav Torti (27 February 1875 – 18 October 1942) was a Croatian sculptor. His works can be found at the Croatian Museum of Naïve Art in Zagreb.

References

Croatian sculptors
1875 births
1942 deaths
19th-century sculptors
20th-century sculptors
People from the Kingdom of Croatia-Slavonia
19th-century Croatian sculptors
20th-century Croatian sculptors
Sculptors from the Austro-Hungarian Empire
Yugoslav sculptors